NUSW may refer to:
National Union of Sahrawi Women, the women's wing of the Polisario Front
National Union of Scottish Mineworkers, a Scottish trade union